Homeboy is a 1988 drama film, directed by Michael Seresin. It was written by and stars Mickey Rourke in the role of self-destructive cowboy/boxer Johnny Walker. Christopher Walken also stars as Walker's slightly corrupt promoter who encourages him to fight whilst hiding from him the fact that one more punch in the wrong place would kill him. 
The film was briefly released in some theatres in 1988 by TriStar through their distribution deal with Carolco, but was more widely seen on home video shortly after. Lionsgate reissued it on DVD on September 1, 2009. Shout Factory released the film on Blu-ray in 2020.

Plot

Johnny Walker (Mickey Rourke) is a down-and-out boxer with brain damage who has recently moved into a sea-side resort. He falls in love with Ruby (Debra Feuer), a carnival owner with whom he shares much in common. He also befriends Wesley Pendergrass (Christopher Walken), a corrupt promoter. Wesley and Johnny form a strong friendship, and it's clear that Johnny comes to idolize Wesley who wants to use Johnny as muscle in a robbery and asks for his help. Johnny has to choose between the love of Ruby or the friendship of Wesley.

Cast
Mickey Rourke as Johnny Walker
Christopher Walken as Wesley Pendergass
Debra Feuer as Ruby
Thomas Quinn as Lou
Kevin Conway as Grazziano
Antony Alda as Ray
Jon Polito as Moe Fingers
Bill Slayton as Bill
David Albert Taylor as Cannonball
Joseph Ragno as Cotten's Trainer
Matthew Lewis as Cotten
Willy DeVille as Moe's Bodyguard
Rubén Blades as Doctor
Sam Gray as Barber
Dondre Whitfield as Billy Harrison
Stephen Baldwin as Luna Park Drunk
Michael Buffer as Ring Announcer

Production
Exterior shots in Asbury Park include the boardwalk, the beach, Paramount Theatre, Cookman Avenue. Shots in Belmar include Alfred's Ice Cream Cafe and Pied Piper Ice Cream. Interior shots in Asbury Park include the Convention Hall and Belmar Barber Shop in Belmar. The Tillie mural and the Palace Amusements building can be seen in the background, a staple of Asbury Park and its culture. During the boxing scenes, the Convention Hall is used as the venue. This is the first of two times Rourke used the famed venue in films. The second was for 2008's The Wrestler.

Christopher Walken told Film Comment in August, 1992:

Soundtrack
See Homeboy – Original Score Performed by Eric Clapton.

In popular culture
In Bob Dylan's first memoir, Chronicles Volume One, he writes of a trip to the movies during the recording of the album Oh Mercy. He writes of Mickey Rourke:
He could break your heart with a look. The movie traveled to the moon every time he came onto the screen. Nobody could hold a candle to him. He was just there, didn't have to say hello or goodbye.

Dylan would later work with Rourke on his film Masked and Anonymous in 2001.

References 

Film Comment, July/August 1992, "Out There on a Visit," Gavin Smith interview with Christopher Walken

External links 

Who Needs an Oscar Anyway? Mickey Rourke's 'Homeboy' at PopMatters.

1988 films
1980s sports drama films
American boxing films
American crime drama films
1988 drama films
Films produced by Elliott Kastner
1980s English-language films
1980s American films